Cedric Diggory is a fictional character in J. K. Rowling's Harry Potter series. He is one of the main characters in the fourth book, Harry Potter and the Goblet of Fire, as he represents Hogwarts School of Witchcraft and Wizardry in the Triwizard Tournament, alongside Harry Potter. Cedric is murdered by Peter Pettigrew on Lord Voldemort's orders during Voldemort's resurrection in Little Hangleton.

Cedric's death becomes a point of trauma and guilt for Harry and continues to haunt him, which leads him to form Dumbledore's Army as a way to help teach his fellow students to protect themselves in battle. His death is also a focal point of the stage play Harry Potter and the Cursed Child. 

Cedric was portrayed by Robert Pattinson in the film adaptation of Goblet of Fire and was briefly portrayed by Joe Livermore in Prisoner of Azkaban. His voice is acted by Blake Ritson in the Harry Potter and the Goblet of Fire video game.

Fictional character biography
Cedric Diggory first begins attending Hogwarts School of Witchcraft and Wizardry in 1989 and is sorted into Hufflepuff. It is presumed that Cedric was familiar with Fred and George Weasley as they were in the same year level. Cedric is also close with Cho Chang and the two are romantically involved. Eventually Cedric becomes a popular student and is elected as Seeker for the Hufflepuff Quidditch team, with him then becoming the team captain and a prefect in the same year.

Prisoner of Azkaban
Cedric first faces Harry Potter during the Quidditch tournament in Prisoner of Azkaban, and ends up catching the Golden Snitch after Harry faints in the presence of Dementors. Cedric offers to replay the match but the offer is declined by Gryffindor captain Oliver Wood, who feels that Diggory had won the game.

Goblet of Fire
The next year, Cedric and his father, Amos, attend the Quidditch World Cup alongside Harry, Hermione Granger and the Weasley family. Upon arriving at Hogwarts for his sixth year, Cedric puts his name forth in the Goblet of Fire and is selected as the Hogwarts champion alongside Fleur Delacour from Beauxbatons and Victor Krum from Durmstrang. Despite all three champions being chosen, the Goblet of Fire nominates Harry to become the fourth Triwizard Champion. Cedric remains kind to Harry whilst everyone else assumes Harry was lying when he states that he did not put his name in the Goblet of Fire.

Despite having two champions from the school, the majority of Hogwarts students support Cedric, with students even creating enchanted badges that say "Support Cedric Diggory, the Real Hogwarts Champion". Cedric is opposed to the badges and tries to get his classmates not to wear them. In the first task, Harry gives Cedric a hand by informing him in advance that the task involves dragons. Cedric's dragon is a Swedish Short-Snout, from which he has to retrieve the Golden Egg it is guarding. Cedric achieves this by transfiguring a rock into a labrador to distract the dragon whilst he retrieves the egg. The dragon is distracted by Cedric, but burns half of his face. After completing the task, Cedric is informed by Barty Crouch, Jr. (disguised as Alastor Moody via Polyjuice Potion) to place the egg underwater and listen to it. Cedric takes the egg to the Prefect's bathroom and figures out that the second task will involve the merpeople.

At the Yule Ball, Cedric attends with Ravenclaw's Seeker, Cho Chang, as his date. Towards the end of the night, Cedric informs Harry about placing the egg underwater as repayment for Harry warning him about the First Task. Knowing he will have to breathe underwater for one hour during the Second Task, Cedric applies the Bubble-Head Charm and retrieved Cho, his hostage, from the Black Lake. He quickly warns Harry about the time limit before finishing, as Harry is worried about Fleur's hostage as she has been eliminated. After both tasks were completed, Cedric and Harry are tied for first place in the Tournament standings.

Cedric's father travels to Hogwarts to be with his son for the third and final task in the tournament. Amos is displeased with Harry due to the media storm that has been covering him during the tournament, for which Cedric apologises for and defends Harry. Due to being tied at first place, Cedric and Harry enter the maze together, but eventually split up. After escaping a Blast-Ended Skrewt, Cedric is attacked by a bewitched Viktor Krum, who tries to use the Cruciatus Curse on Cedric per the direction of Crouch Jr., before being rescued by Harry before splitting up again. Cedric spots the Triwizard Cup and races towards it before being attacked by an acromantula. Harry and Cedric reunite again and defeated the Acromantula together, finding themselves at the Triwizard Cup. Cedric urges Harry to take the Cup as a favour for saving his life twice that evening; after realising that they've both helped each other, they agree to both take the Cup. The Cup turns out to have been enchanted by Crouch Jr. to act as a Portkey, which takes them to a graveyard in Little Hangleton.

Upon their arrival in the graveyard, Cedric draws his wand, suspicious about their surroundings. Moments later, Peter Pettigrew emerges carrying a small being, which turns out to be Lord Voldemort. While Harry is suffering through searing pain through his scar due to the Horcrux in his body responding to Voldemort's presence, Voldemort orders Pettigrew to "kill the spare", prompting Pettigrew to use the Killing Curse on Cedric. During Harry's subsequent duel with Voldemort, their wands connect, and Cedric's ghost emerges from the wand along with the ghosts of Harry's parents. Before distracting Voldemort, Cedric asks Harry to take his body back to his parents. Harry breaks the connection and sprints over to Cedric's body, summoning the Cup to transport him and the body back to Hogwarts.

Due to Cedric's death, the Leaving Feast on the last day of the school year is instead turned into a memorial service for him. Dumbledore informs the students, against the wishes of the Ministry of Magic, that Cedric was murdered by Voldemort. In the following months, the Ministry of Magic, under the direction of Cornelius Fudge, orchestrate a smear campaign on Harry and Dumbledore in an attempt to silence panic at Voldemort's return and hush up Cedric's death. Cedric's death proves to be an inspiration for the students of Hogwarts, and eventually rebellion against the iron fist Dolores Umbridge imposes onto the school. This leads Harry, Ron and Hermione to form Dumbledore's Army for the students of Hogwarts, considering Umbridge is refusing to allow students to learn Defence Against the Dark Arts. Harry believes that students need to know how to defend themselves, due in large part to the return of Voldemort and the re-forming of the Death Eaters, so that no other student meets the same fate as Cedric. Harry continues to honour Cedric's memory through Dumbledore's Army and by keeping one of the "Support Cedric Diggory" badges.

Appearances in other material
Cedric's death is a major plot point in the stage play Harry Potter and the Cursed Child, in which Harry and Ginny Weasley's son Albus uses a Time-Turner and prevents Cedric's death. Due to his humiliation in the Triwizard Tournament, Cedric eventually becomes a Death Eater and kills Neville Longbottom. Due to Neville's death, the final Horcrux Nagini was never destroyed, and as a result Voldemort is never defeated, kills Harry and takes over the Wizarding World.

Production
Henry Cavill auditioned for the part of Cedric Diggory but lost out to Pattinson. Ironically, Cavill was also Stephenie Meyer's first choice for the role of Edward Cullen in Twilight, a role which also went to Pattinson. Pattinson has stated that he would prefer to reprise his role as Cedric Diggory over portraying Edward Cullen in the Twilight films again. Pattinson credits his experience during the production of Goblet of Fire for keeping him in acting.

Reception
Cedric's death was listed by Insider.com as the most devastating death in the Harry Potter films, particularly noting the mourning of Cedric's father and Harry's refusal to leave Cedric's body.

The character's fate in the alternate reality of The Cursed Child was controversial for fans of the series, especially considering that Cedric was an embodiment of good-natured and kind-heartedness. While the play and novelisation were controversial enough with fans of the series, the idea that Cedric's "heart of gold" would turn evil was a difficult idea to stomach for some readers, especially with the idea of him murdering another beloved character such as Neville Longbottom.

References

Harry Potter characters
Wizards in fiction
Literary characters introduced in 1999
Teenage characters in literature
Teenage characters in film
Fictional male sportspeople
Fictional murdered people